The 1963 PGA Championship was the 45th PGA Championship, played July 18–21 at the Blue Course of Dallas Athletic Club in Dallas, Texas. Jack Nicklaus won the first of his five PGA Championship titles, two strokes ahead of runner-up Dave Ragan. It was the second major win of the year for Nicklaus, and the third of his eighteen major titles.

Nicklaus entered the final round in third place, three shots behind 54-hole leader Bruce Crampton. At the trophy presentation in the bright sunshine, Nicklaus grasped the very hot Wanamaker Trophy with the aid of a towel.

With the victory, Nicklaus at age 23 joined Gene Sarazen, Byron Nelson, and Ben Hogan as the only winners of all three American majors: the Masters, U.S. Open and PGA Championship. Nicklaus completed the first of his three career grand slams three years later at Muirfield in 1966.

The Open Championship was played the previous week in northwest England at Lytham St Annes, one of five times in the 1960s that these two majors were played in consecutive weeks in July. Nicklaus bogeyed the last two holes at Lytham and finished a stroke out of the 36-hole Saturday playoff, won by Bob Charles. The PGA Championship moved permanently to August in 1969 (except 1971, when it was played in late February to avoid Florida's summer). After cool temperatures in Britain, the oppressive July heat in Dallas was difficult for many to 

Nicklaus won the Masters in April, the first of his six green jackets, marking only the third time that the Masters champion won the PGA Championship in the same calendar year.  He was preceded by Sam Snead in 1949 (May) and Jack Burke Jr. in 1956.  Through 2016, it has been accomplished only four times, twice by Nicklaus, and most recently  in August 1975.

Course layout

Past champions in the field

Made the cut

Missed the cut 

Source:

Round summaries

First round
Thursday, July 18, 1963

Source:

Second round
Friday, July 19, 1963

Source:

Third round
Saturday, July 20, 1963

Source:

Final round
Sunday, July 21, 1963

Source:

References

External links
PGA Media Guide 2012
PGA.com – 1963 PGA Championship 
Golf Channel: 1963 PGA Championship
PGA of America   Nicklaus reflects on 1963 PGA Championship

PGA Championship
Golf in Texas
Sports competitions in Dallas
PGA Championship
PGA Championship
PGA Championship
PGA Championship